Nabil Begg (born 17 March 2004) is a Fijian footballer who plays as a midfielder for Fiji Premier League club Ba and the Fiji national team.

Club career
Begg is a youth academy graduate of Ba. On 24 October 2021, he scored his first goal for the club in a 2–1 league win against Suva.

International career
In February 2022, Begg was named in Fiji squad for 2022 FIFA World Cup qualification tournament. He made his international debut on 10 March 2022 in a 3–0 friendly win against Vanuatu.

Career statistics

Club

International

References

External links
 
 Nabil Begg at Oceania Football Center

2004 births
Living people
Association football midfielders
Fijian footballers
Fiji international footballers
Ba F.C. players